The president of the Senate is the highest authority of the Senate of Spain, the upper house of the Cortes Generales, the legislative branch of Spain. The President is elected by and among the incumbent senators.

The office was established in 1834 by the Royal Statue which structured the legislature as a bicameral parliament with an upper house called House of Peers, formed by high clerics, grandees, other nobles and relevant members of the civil society. The current name of the upper house is Senate since 1837 and is currently regulated in Part III, Section 69 of the Constitution of 1978 which establishes a chamber with two kind of members: popular-elected senators and senators designated by regional legislatures.

In its almost two centuries of history, the Senate has not been always active. Between August 1836 and November 1837 the upper house was suppressed because of a revolt against the conservative government of the Queen Regent which forced her to reinstate the Constitution of 1812. In late 1837, a new Constitution was passed and the political stability restored. The next suppression happened in 1873, after the abdication of King Amadeo I, and was reestablished in 1877 when the Constitution of 1876 was passed.

Under the protection of this last constitution, there was the longest period of stability that lasted until the dictatorship of Primo de Rivera in 1923, which established a unicameral parliament. After the end of the dictatorship and the end of the Reign of Alfonso XIII, the Second Republic did not recover the upper house and maintained the unicameral parliament, thing that also did the dictator Francisco Franco. With the recovery of democracy, in 1977 the bicameral parliament was reestablished.

Since its creation in 1834, 43 people have served as president in 62 presidencies. The first president was the Duke of Bailén who served for 60 days before resigning. The shortest presidency was that of the Marquess of Miraflores which was president briefly between August 3 and August 12, 1836 and the longest was that of Javier Rojo serving 7 years, 8 months and 10 days. Many presidents have served in non-consecutive terms in office; The Marquess of Miraflores and Eugenio Montero Ríos served in five non-consecutive terms. The first woman who have served as president was Esperanza Aguirre, between 1999 and 2002. The current and 62nd President is Ander Gil.

List

House of Peers

Senate

References

 
Senate
Lists of political office-holders in Spain